Misraq Belessa (Amharic: ምስራቅ በለሳ) transliterated as "East Belessa" is one of the woredas in the Amhara Region of Ethiopia. It is named after the former province of Belessa, which lay in the 
same area. Part of the Semien Gondar Zone, Misraq Belessa is bordered on the south by Debub Gondar Zone, on the west by Mirab Belessa, on the northwest by the Wegera, on the north by Jan Amora, and on the east by Wag Hemra Zone. Towns in Misraq Belessa include Gohala (ጎሃላ) & Hamusit (ሀሙሲት). Misraq Belessa was part of former Belessa woreda.

Demographics
Based on the 2007 national census conducted by the Central Statistical Agency of Ethiopia (CSA), this woreda has a total population of 97,838, of whom 50,587 are men and 47,251 women; 13,057 or 13.4% are urban inhabitants. The majority of the inhabitants practiced Ethiopian Orthodox Christianity, with 98% reporting that as their religion, while 2% of the population said they were Muslim.

Notes

Districts of Amhara Region